John Forbes "Scotty" Alcock (November 29, 1885 – January 30, 1973) was a  Major League Baseball player who played one season with the Chicago White Sox in 1914.

References

External links

1885 births
1973 deaths
Chicago White Sox players
Baseball players from Ohio
Major League Baseball third basemen
Major League Baseball second basemen
Birmingham Barons players
East Liverpool Potters (baseball) players
Chattanooga Lookouts players
Mobile Sea Gulls players
Albany Babies players
Canton Statesmen players
Grand Rapids Black Sox players
Erie Sailors players
Oakland Oaks (baseball) players
Vernon Tigers players
Beaumont Exporters players
People from Wooster, Ohio